Calisto may refer to:

Calisto (butterfly), a genus of butterflies in the family Nymphalidae
Calisto MT, an old style serif typeface
La Calisto, an opera by Francesco Cavalli about the mythological character Callisto

People
Calisto Tanzi, an Italian businessman and embezzler
Henrique Calisto, coach of the Vietnam national football team
Calisto (footballer) (born 1975), Orlando Calisto de Souza, Brazilian footballer

See also
Callisto (disambiguation)
Kalisto (disambiguation)